Abdallah Berrabeh (born 8 August 1993) is a Tunisian footballer who plays for Saudi Second Division side Al-Rayyan as a defender.

References

External links
 
 

1993 births
Living people
Tunisian footballers
Tunisian expatriate footballers
US Monastir (football) players
EO Sidi Bouzid players
Stade Sportif Sfaxien players
Stade Gabèsien players
Al-Kholood Club players
Al-Rayyan Club (Saudi Arabia) players
Tunisian Ligue Professionnelle 1 players
Saudi Second Division players
Expatriate footballers in Saudi Arabia
Tunisian expatriate sportspeople in Saudi Arabia
Association football defenders